Michael Dewayne Hunter Jr. (born April 19, 1993) is a former American football cornerback. He played college football at Indiana prior to transferring to Oklahoma State. He was signed by the New York Giants as an undrafted free agent after the 2016 NFL Draft.

High school career
Hunter attended West Monroe High School where he lettered four times in football, he also lettered in basketball and track & field. He also had a 4.0 Grade point average (GPA). He was a member of the All-northeast Louisiana and All-district teams as a junior and senior. As an All-state cornerback, he recorded 44 tackles, two forced fumbles and three fumble recoveries, one interception and five passes defensed as a senior in 2010. He was also a member of the academic All-state team as well. He was ranked the 81st best cornerback in the nation by ESPN.com.

College career
Hunter then attended Indiana University where he majored in exercise science.

As a freshman in 2011 he appeared in all 12 games with three starts. He recorded 13 tackles (nine solo) with passes defensed. As a sophomore in 2012, he redshirt. In 2013, as a redshirt sophomore, he started all 12 games. For the season he recorded 42 tackles (34 solo), three tackles-for-loss, one interception, seven passes defensed and once forced fumble. He was nan All-Big Ten academic selection. As a redshirt junior in 2014, he started all 12 games. He recorded 36 tackles (29 solo), 3.5 tackles-for-loss, one interception and five passes defensed. Again he was an academic All-Big Ten selection.

After graduating with a degree in exercise science from Indiana, he transferred to Oklahoma State University. In 2015, he appeared in 10 games and recorded 20 tackles (18 solo), one tackle-for-loss, one pass defensed and two interceptions.

Professional career

New York Giants
After going undrafted in the 2016 NFL Draft, Hunter signed with the New York Giants in May 2016. He was released on October 11, 2016. He was re-signed to a reserve/futures contract on January 9, 2017.

On October 17, 2017, Hunter was waived/injured by the Giants after suffering a hamstring injury in Week 6 and was placed on injured reserve. He was released on October 23, 2017.

New York Jets
On November 11, 2017, Hunter was signed to the New York Jets' practice squad. He was released on November 24, 2017.

Denver Broncos
On November 29, 2017, Hunter was signed to the Denver Broncos' practice squad. He was promoted to the active roster on December 19, 2017.

On September 1, 2018, Hunter was waived by the Broncos.

Buffalo Bills
On September 18, 2018, Hunter was signed to the Buffalo Bills' practice squad. He was released on October 9, 2018.

Houston Texans
On December 26, 2018, Hunter was signed to the Houston Texans practice squad.

New York Giants (second stint)
On January 17, 2019, Hunter signed a reserve/future contract with the New York Giants. He was waived on May 6, 2019.

Kansas City Chiefs
On July 31, 2019, Hunter signed with the Kansas City Chiefs. He was waived with an injury designation August 31, 2019. After clearing waivers, he was placed on the Chiefs’ injured reserve. He was waived from injured reserve with an injury settlement on September 4.

References

External links

 Indiana Hoosiers bio
 Oklahoma State Cowboys bio
 New York Giants bio

1993 births
Living people
American football cornerbacks
Denver Broncos players
Buffalo Bills players
Houston Texans players
Indiana Hoosiers football players
Kansas City Chiefs players
Oklahoma State Cowboys football players
New York Giants players
New York Jets players
Players of American football from Louisiana
Sportspeople from Monroe, Louisiana